André "Titi" Buengo (born 11 February 1980) is a retired Angolan footballer who played as a striker.

Early life
Born in Luanda, Buengo moved to France at the age of 8.

Buengo is the son of former Petro de Luanda player Haia.

Club career
Buengo played for Amiens, Neuchâtel Xamax, Créteil, and Troyes AC.

International career
Buengo is a member of the Angola national team, and was called up to the 2006 World Cup.

References

External links

 penangfa.com

1980 births
Living people
Footballers from Luanda
Association football forwards
Angolan footballers
Angolan expatriate sportspeople in Malaysia
Angola international footballers
Wasquehal Football players
Olympique Saint-Quentin players
US Créteil-Lusitanos players
Grenoble Foot 38 players
Neuchâtel Xamax FCS players
Amiens SC players
Clermont Foot players
ES Troyes AC players
LB Châteauroux players
Tours FC players
Ligue 2 players
2006 FIFA World Cup players
2006 Africa Cup of Nations players
Expatriate footballers in Malaysia
Angolan expatriate sportspeople in Greece
Olympiacos Volos F.C. players
Expatriate footballers in Greece